Brigitta Fischer is a Hungarian World Champion bridge player. She won the Women's Team event in Wroclaw in 2022.

She has represented Hungary in Junior events.

Bridge accomplishments

Wins
 World Bridge Series Women Teams (1) 2022

Runners up
 European Women U26 Teams (1) 2019

References

External links
 
 

Hungarian contract bridge players
Living people
Year of birth missing (living people)
Place of birth missing (living people)